The 1st Nunavut Legislature lasted from 1999 to 2004. The nineteen members were elected in the 1999 Nunavut general election held 15 February. The Legislative Assembly of Nunavut runs on a consensus style government, members are elected as non-partisan and the assembly meets as a whole to elect a premier, the cabinet and the speaker. The premier hands out the cabinet jobs.

The cabinet is considered the government and the Regular members are considered the opposition. The make up of the assembly acts as a minority parliament. The cabinet must gain the support of the regular members in order to pass bills. Traditionally the cabinet votes as a block known as cabinet solidarity.

Cabinet ministers

James Arvaluk was removed from the cabinet in 2003 after being charged with assault.
Manitok Thompson took over as Minister of Education from 2003 to 2004

Speaker

Levi Barnabas was convicted of Sexual Assault in 2000

Regular members

By-election

References

External links
Legislative Assembly of Nunavut
Okalik hands out the cabinet jobs Nunatsiaq News 03/12/99

1
Legislature, 1
Legislature, 1